Home of Economy is a chain of retail stores with eight locations in North Dakota: Grand Forks, Grafton, Devils Lake, Minot, Williston, Jamestown, Watford City and Rugby.  Home of Economy sells a variety of goods: clothing, work wear, home furniture, housewares, automotive goods, tools, farm supplies, hardware, lawn and garden supplies, paint, pet supplies, hunting and fishing equipment, and sporting goods.

History
Founded in 1939 in Thief River Falls, Minnesota by Bob Kiesau and his wife, Jean, Home of Economy was originally an auto parts wholesale business. In February 1940, Bob started a store in Grand Forks, North Dakota, recapping used tires at night and selling them during the day. In the years since, Home of Economy has grown to include stores in other North Dakota cities, including Grafton, Devils Lake, Minot, Williston, Watford City, Jamestown and Rugby.

Home of Economy is considered by many to be the first discount store. Prior to Home of Economy's discount program, free-trade laws required retailers to sell at high, fixed prices, and only fleet operators with five or more machines could receive discounts. In 1950, Bob Kiesau sent his employees to every county seat in the trade area to copy names and addresses of each taxpayer who had listed three or more tractors or combines. He assumed each farmer would have at least one car and one truck that would not be listed on the tax report. From this list, a fleet identification card was mailed to every farmer, enabling them to buy at fleet discounts.

On December 3, 1987, fire destroyed the store in Grand Forks.  The store was back in operation in three separate temporary locations less than a week after the fire began.

Their company's motto is (variously):

"Be wise, Economize"
"The friendly store where your dollar buys more."

Locations
Grand Forks 1508 North Washington Street
Grafton 868 West 12th Street
Devils Lake 1205 Highway 2 East
Minot 107 20th Avenue Southwest
Williston 2102 2nd Avenue West
Watford City 113 6th Street SE Ste 5200
Jamestown Buffalo Mall, 2400 8th Ave SW
Rugby 225 US Highway 2

References
 UND Center for Innovation
 Prairie Business Magazine
 University of North Dakota News

External links 
 Home of Economy website
 Home of Economy blog

Retail companies established in 1939
Companies based in North Dakota
Farm and ranch supply stores of the United States
1939 establishments in Minnesota
Agriculture companies established in 1939
American companies established in 1939